Eulychnia acida is a  flowering plant in the family Cactaceae that is found in Chile.

Description
The plant is an arborescent cactus, of mainly columnar formation that branches out in its growth, with a single base trunk, developing a profuse crown of up to three meters in diameter. It reaches varying heights according to temperature zone and microclimate, of 1.5 to 6 m tall, with many branches. It has long flexible thorns, sometimes robust. The flowers are of medium size, with short petals coloured pink to white.

References

External links
 
 

Notocacteae
Flora of Chile